Pierscien i róża is a 1986 Polish musical film directed by Jerzy Gruza and starring Katarzyna Figura, Stefan Kazuro and Katarzyna Cygan. It is an adaptation of the 1854 novel The Rose and the Ring by the British writer William Makepeace Thackeray.

Cast
 Katarzyna Figura as Rosalba
 Stefan Kazuro as Prince Giglio 
 Katarzyna Cygan as Princess Angelika 
 Zbigniew Zamachowski as Prince Bulbo 
 Wanda Dembek as Old Gruffanuff
 Ewa Kuculis as Young Gruffanuff 
 Ludwik Benoit as Captain Hedzoff 
 Zdzislawa Specht as Black Fairy 
 Bernard Ladysz as King Valorozo 
 Krystyna Tkacz as Queen

References

External links
 

1986 films
Polish musical films
1980s musical films
1980s Polish-language films
Films based on works by William Makepeace Thackeray
Films based on British novels